Sir George Stewart Symes,  (29 July 1882 – 5 December 1962) was a British Army officer and colonial governor.

Career
Symes was born in Kent, the son of Lieutenant Colonel William Alexander Symes of the 71st Highland Light Infantry, and Emily Catherine (née Shore), daughter of Charles Shore, 2nd Baron Teignmouth.

Symes was commissioned a second lieutenant in The Hampshire Regiment in August 1900, and served in South Africa during the end of the Second Boer War in 1902, receiving the rank of lieutenant on 21 April 1902. Symes took part in the Battle of Rooiwal and was stationed for a while in Potchefstroom.  He later stayed briefly in the town of Hermanus which he described as "peaceful." Later that year he was posted in the Aden Hinterland, where he served 1903–1904. He is said to have been the only British army officer to be awarded a Distinguished Service Order (DSO) for services in the hinterland.

He was Governor of the Palestine North District from 1920 to 1925, Chief Secretary to the Government of Palestine from 1925 to 1928, Resident at Aden from 1928 to 1931, Governor of Tanganyika from 1931 to 1934 and Governor-General of the Anglo-Egyptian Sudan from 1934 to 1940. During his time in Tanganyika he gained a reputation for governing in the interest of the indigenous African population. This led to him becoming unpopular with some of the white settlers in that country and in neighboring Kenya, and he was known as being one of the most "pro-African" colonial governors. 

On every issue in which there was conflict between indigenous Africans and European settlers he governed in favor of the Africans. On multiple occasions he had European settlers deported from the country on the grounds they were mistreating Africans. There were British District Commissioners who were administrators under previous governors, and during their time in Tanganyika had learned to speak the Tongwe and Bende languages before being rotated out, Symes had them recalled to Tanganyika and stationed in areas that spoke Tongwe and Bende. He also devoted government resources towards water purification projects, literacy programs and the administration of antibiotics to natives.  

On numerous issues he promoted encouraging the native population to vote on matters that effected them.  He also insisted, as did his predecessor, that Africans be paid the same wages as Europeans and Indians for the same work. When asked in the 1950s if he supported African independence movements he said that he did.

References

External links
 The Malvern Register, 1905
 The Anglo Boer War : Symes, G.S.
 Aden Airways : George Symes

1882 births
1962 deaths
Governors-General of Anglo-Egyptian Sudan
Royal Hampshire Regiment officers
Companions of the Distinguished Service Order
Knights Grand Cross of the Order of St Michael and St George
Knights Grand Cross of the Order of the Bath
British Army personnel of the Second Boer War
People educated at Malvern College
British colonial governors and administrators in Asia
British Army personnel of World War I
Governors of Tanganyika (territory)
Colony of Aden people
Chief Secretaries of Palestine
People from Wateringbury